María Jesús Rosa Reina (20 June 1974 – 18 December 2018) was a Spanish boxer, WIBF and four-time European flyweight champion.

Biography
Rosa Reina was trained by José Chumilla. Her first professional fight was in 1999 against the Spanish champion Esther Paez.

On 5 March 2002, after knocking out Viktoria Varga, she became the European flyweight champion and she defended her European title three times that year. She fought with big boxers like the American Terri Moss, against whom she won the vacant WIBF World Light Flyweight championship on 6 November 2003 in Madrid, or the WIBF World Flyweight champion, the German Regina Halmich.

In 2005, Rosa Reina retired after being defeated in a world title fight by WIBF World Flyweight champion Regina Halmich on 10 November 2005, who won by the 12-round decision of the judges.

Her final record was nineteen matches won, four by knockout, with one loss and no draws.

Rosa Reina died on 18 December 2018 as a result of cancer. She was 44.

Professional boxing record

References

External links
 
 Round by Round Report: Halmich vs. Rosa

1974 births
2018 deaths
Spanish boxers
Spanish women boxers
Women boxers
World boxing champions
Flyweight boxers
Sportspeople from Madrid